Barrinha is a municipality in the state of São Paulo in Brazil founded on December 30, 1953. The population is 33,180 (2020 est.) in an area of 146 km². The elevation is 505 m.

References

Municipalities in São Paulo (state)